Newtownbreda is a residential suburb of South Belfast, clustered around a small and now largely invisible 18th century village. The Belfast A55 "Outer Ring" dual carriage-way provides transport links to the city centre, as well as the outskirts of the city.

History
At one time "Newtownbreda" was a small village in South Belfast. However, it is now part of the Greater Belfast conurbation and Newtownbreda is a descriptor used loosely to describe the very broad area including Belvoir, Four Winds and Knockbreda. It is a largely  residential area of private housing.

Notable Locations
Newtownbreda has several churches including the 18th century Church of Ireland Parish Church, which uses the name of the civil parish Knockbreda and which owes its existence to Arthur Hill from nearby Belvoir Demesne. The church consecrated by Francis Hutchinson, Bishop of Down and Connor, on Sunday 7 August 1737.

The Forestside Shopping Centre was developed by Sainsbury's between 1996 and 1998. Belvoir Park Golf Club and Belvoir Forest Park are also located nearby. A  Tesco store was built on a brownfield site, (formerly a warehouse for the Stewarts Supermarket chain) and opened in 2007.

1992 NIFSL bombing 

On 23 September 1992 a Provisional IRA bomb destroyed the Northern Ireland Forensic Science Laboratory (NIFSL) on the Newtownbreda Road. The IRA had given a warning, and British Army bomb disposal experts were investigating an abandoned van when the explosion occurred. No people were killed or seriously injured, but 42 houses were totally destroyed.

References

Geography of Belfast
Wards of Northern Ireland
Civil parish of Knockbreda